A gulf is a large inlet from the ocean into a landmass.

Gulf or the gulf may also refer to:

Places

 Gulf Country, a region in Australia
 Gulf Freeway, a highway in Texas, United States
 Gulf, North Carolina, a census-designated place in the United States
 Gulf of Mexico, Atlantic Ocean basin extending into southern North America
 Gulf Province, Papua New Guinea
 Persian Gulf, arm of the Indian Ocean in Western Asia
 Arab states of the Persian Gulf, group of Arab states which border the Persian Gulf

Arts and media
 Gulf (film), 2017 Indian Telugu-language film
 Gulf (novella), by Robert A. Heinlein (1949)
 The Gulf (play), by Audrey Cefaly
 The Gulf: The Making of an American Sea, book by Jack E. Davis
 The Gulf (TV series), New Zealand-set crime drama series

Businesses and organizations
 Global University Leaders Forum, an organization within World Economic Forum
 Gulf Air, the principal flag carrier of the Kingdom of Bahrain
 Gulf and Western Industries, an American conglomerate
 Gulf Cartel, a criminal organisation in Mexico 
 Gulf FM (disambiguation), various radio stations
 Gulf High School, a four-year public high school in New Port Richey, Florida
 Gulf News, a daily English language newspaper published from Dubai
 Gulf Oil, a major oil company from 1901 to 1985
Gulf Canada, a major Canadian oil company since 1906, a subsidiary of Gulf Oil
 JWA Gulf, a Gulf Oil-sponsored motor racing team of John Wyer in the 1960s and 1970s
 Gulf Power Company, an American investor-owned electric utility

Other uses
 Gulf house, a type of farmhouse that emerged in the 16th and 17th centuries in North Germany
 Gulf of evaluation, the degree to which a computer system provides representations that can be directly perceived and interpreted in terms of the expectations and intentions of the user
 Gulf of execution, a term usually used in human computer interaction to describe the gap between a user's goal for action and the means to execute that goal

See also
 
 
 Arabian Gulf (disambiguation)
 Gulf breeze (disambiguation)
 Gulf Coast (disambiguation)
 Grand Gulf (disambiguation)
 Gulf Building (disambiguation)
 Gulf Cup (disambiguation)
 Gulf states (disambiguation)
 Gulf University (disambiguation)
 Golf (disambiguation)
 Gulf Stream, a maritime current
 Gulf War, 1990–91 war waged by coalition forces led by the United States against Iraq
 Gulf Coast of the United States, the coastline along the Southern United States and the Gulf of Mexico
 List of gulfs, a list of large bays and gulfs